Prince Boris Alexeyevich Golitsyn (surname sometimes transcribed Galitzin, ; 1654–1714) was a Russian politician of the noble Golitsyn family. His chief political opponent was his own cousin Prince Vasily Vasilyevich Golitsyn.

Life

Boris was a court chamberlain since 1676. He was the young tsar Peter the Great's tutor and chief supporter when, in 1689, Peter resisted the usurpations of his elder half sister Sophia, and the head of the loyal council which assembled at the Trinity monastery during the crisis of the struggle. It was Golitsyn who suggested taking refuge in that strong fortress and won over the boyars of the opposite party.

In 1690 he was created a boyar and shared with Lev Naryshkin, Peter's uncle, the conduct of home affairs. After the death of the tsaritsa Natalia, Peter's mother, in 1694, his influence increased still further. The estate Bolshiye Vyazyomy was given to him; since then Vyazyomy remained the ancestral estate of the Golitsyns, although Boris rarely came to Vyazyomy preferring to live at the Dubrovitsy estate (near Podolsk), which came from his wife's family. From 1690 to 1704, in the Dubrovitsy estate, he led the construction of a stone Church of the Theotokos of the Sign. His son Vasily (1681-1710) inherited the estate.

He accompanied Peter to the White Sea (1694–1695); he took part in the Azov campaign (1695); and was one of the triumvirate who ruled Russia during Peters first foreign tour (1697–1698) to Holland and England. The Astrakhan rebellion (1706), which affected all the districts under his government, shook Peter's confidence in him, and seriously impaired his position. In 1707 he was superseded in the Volgan provinces by Andrei Matveev. A year before his death he entered a monastery.

Golitsyn was a typical representative of Russian society of the end of the 17th century leaning towards Westernism. In many respects he was far in advance of his time. He was highly educated, spoke Latin with graceful fluency, frequented the society of scholars and had his children carefully educated according to the best European models. Yet this eminent, superior personage was an habitual drunkard, an uncouth savage who intruded upon the hospitality of wealthy foreigners, and was not ashamed to seize upon any dish he took a fancy to, and send it home to his wife. It was his reckless drunkenness which ultimately ruined him in the estimation of Peter the Great, despite his previous inestimable services.

References

Attribution

1654 births
1714 deaths
Russian princes
Boris Alexeyevich
17th-century Russian people
18th-century politicians from the Russian Empire